Food psychology is the psychological study of how people choose the food they eat (food choice), along with food and eating behaviors. Food psychology is an applied psychology, using existing psychological methods and findings to understand food choice and eating behaviors. Factors studied by food psychology include food cravings, sensory experiences of food, perceptions of food security and food safety, price, available product information such as nutrition labeling and the purchasing environment (which may be physical or online). Food psychology also encompasses broader sociocultural factors such as cultural perspectives on food, public awareness of "what constitutes a sustainable diet", and food marketing including "food fraud" where ingredients are intentionally motivated for economic gain as opposed to nutritional value. These factors are considered to interact with each other along with an individual's history of food choices to form new food choices and eating behaviors.

The development of food choice is considered to fall into three main categories: properties of the food, individual differences and sociocultural influences. Food psychology studies psychological aspects of individual differences, although due to the interaction between factors and the variance in definitions, food psychology is often studied alongside other aspects of food choice including nutrition psychology.

, there are no specific journals for food psychology, with research being published in both nutrition and psychology journals. 

Eating behaviors which are analysed by food psychology include disordered eating, behavior associated with food neophobia, and the public broadcasting/streaming of eating (mukbang). Food psychology has been studied extensively using theories of cognitive dissonance and fallacious reasoning.

COVID-19 
Food psychology has been used to examine how eating behaviors have been globally affected by the COVID-19 pandemic. Changed food preferences due to COVID-19 have been found, with both beneficial and harmful effects on food choice. Studies in Spain and Saudi Arabia found a reduced consumption of processed foods and junk food, and higher rates of sustainable diets, whereas UK residents and US university students were found to have less influence in household food choice, increased snacking behaviors and generally increased consumption of junk food. 48% of residents in a UK study reported increased food intake, especially for high energy foods, and a similar percentage reported increased food cravings. Increased food stockpiling and reduced effects of familiarity on food choice were also observed.

A 2020 review found the largest effects of COVID-19 in food choice to be from lockdowns, income loss leading to reduced food security, and bereavement due to COVID-19. For example, one study in Iran found 61% of the sample population experiencing food insecurity which resulted from both economic and psychological effects. 

An individual's need for closure, a psychological measure of desire for certainty, was found to predict food stockpiling and wasting of food. A study in Chile found higher anxiety as a predictor for fast food and pastry intake, suggesting that emotional eating has been amplified due to COVID-19. By comparison, a UK study found lower levels of food craving control to be the most accurate predictor of increased high energy sweet and savoury food intake, along with emotional overeating, emotional undereating, experienced satiety and enjoyment of food being found as poor predictors.

The tendency to stockpile or hoard food has also been explained using the theory of planned behavior, using data collected from Vietnam that has suggested high risk perception is correlated with food stockpiling and panic buying. The perception of lacking food was found higher scoring in US women than US men, and higher in Indian men compared to Indian women, suggesting that country of residence may be a moderator to how gender affects need for closure in food, based on household roles.

Italy 
Italy has received particular academic attention during the COVID-19 pandemic for studies of food choice as the country was one of the most severely affected by COVID-19. One study found survey results that "Around 40% of the [Italian] population perceive that strengthening the immune defences through nutrition is not important to reduce the risk of coronavirus disease". Survey results suggest that cooking behaviors were increased and junk food consumption was reduced, along with raised public interest in sustainability issues including sustainable food products.

Ethnocentrism has been proposed as an explanation for the large change in food choice and eating behaviors of Italians during COVID-19.

See also 

 Food science

References 

Branches of psychology
Food and drink
Dietetics
Eating behaviors of humans
Food science